Utpala is Sanscrit for nymphaea nouchali, the blue lotus, significant in Indian religions and art.  It may also refer to:

 Utpala (astronomer), 10th-century mathematician-astronomer from India
 Utpala (Paramara king), a 10th-century king of Malwa region in India
 Utpaladeva, 10th century Shaivite philosopher-theologian from Kashmir
 Utpala dynasty of Kashmir, India; ruled between 8th to 11th centuries
 Naraka (Buddhism), the concept of hell in Buddhism
 Utpala Sen, Indian actor